Conklin is a surname of Irish origin 

Spelling variations include Concklin, Conkling, Conckeleyne, Coughlin, Couglin and others.

List of people surnamed Conklin
 Brian Conklin (born 1989), basketball player
 Cary Conklin (born 1968), American football quarterback for the Washington Redskins and the San Francisco 49ers
 Chester Conklin (1888–1971), silent film comedian
 David Conklin (born 1955), American ice sledge hockey player
 Edmund Smith Conklin (1884–1942), American author and psychologist
 Edwin Grant Conklin (1863–1952), American biologist
 Elias George Conklin (1845–1901), Canadian politician, member of the Legislative Assembly of Manitoba, fifth Mayor of Winnipeg
 Frederick L. Conklin (1888–1974), American football player and coach, medical doctor and naval officer
 Gary Conklin, American documentary filmmaker
 George Emerson Conklin (1921–1942), United States Marine
 Groff Conklin (1904–1968), science fiction anthologist
 H. Scott Conklin (born 1958), American politician, member of the Pennsylvania House of Representatives (since 2007)
 Harold Conklin (1926–2016), anthropologist
 Heinie Conklin (Charles John Conklin; 1886–1959), American silent film actor
 Hugh Conklin, college football player
 Jack Conklin (born 1994), American football player
 James Conklin (politician) (1831–1899), American politician, mayor of Madison, Wisconsin
 Jane Elizabeth Dexter Conklin (1831–1914), American writer
 Jennie Maria Drinkwater Conklin (1841–1900), American author and social activist
 John Conklin (born 1937), scenic designer
 John French Conklin (1891–1973), American Brigadier general, Chief Engineer, Third U.S. Army
 Jonathan S. Conklin (1770–1839), New York politician
 Josh Conklin (born 1979), American football player and coach
 Larry Conklin, American guitar player, singer, songwriter and music journalist
 Lee Conklin, American artist
 Lydia Conklin, American writer
 Nan Dieter-Conklin (1926–2014), American radio astronomer. 
 Pearl Conklin (1879–1961), American composer
 Roland R. Conklin (1858–1938), American financier
 Ryan A. Conklin (born 1985), United States Army Sergeant, Iraq War veteran, and television personality
 Sylvester J. Conklin (1829–1914), American politician, member of the Wisconsin State Assembly
 Ty Conklin (born 1976), an American ice hockey goaltender
 Tyler Conklin (born 1995), American football player
 William Conklin (1872–1935), an American actor
 William J. Conklin (1923–2018), American architect and archaeologist
 William T. Conklin (1908–1990), New York state senator

See also
 Conkling (disambiguation)

References

Surnames
Occupational surnames